Cold Justice is an investigative true crime series originally broadcast on TNT and currently on Oxygen. The series, produced by Dick Wolf, follows former Harris County, Texas prosecutor Kelly Siegler and a team of investigators as they reopen unsolved murder cases with the consent and assistance of local law enforcement. Crime scene investigator Yolanda McClary, a veteran of the Las Vegas Metro police, also appeared on the series; McClary had earlier been the inspiration for Catherine Willows, the character portrayed by Marg Helgenberger on the series CSI.

, the team has helped to generate 49 arrests and 21 convictions, in addition to four confessions, three guilty pleas and three murder convictions.

Although TNT made no official announcement, McClary wrote on her personal Facebook page in mid-2016 that the series was canceled. She later said that the production company is shopping the series to other networks. In February 2017, it was announced that Cold Justice had been acquired by Oxygen and resumed broadcasts on July 22, 2017. The sixth season aired from July 10, 2021, to January 1, 2022.

Episodes

Critical reception

Cold Justice scored 66 out of 100 on Metacritic based on five "generally favorable" reviews. Mary McNamara of the Los Angeles Times states, "Although one can be fairly certain, if only for legal reasons, that any suspect shown on television is going to turn out to be guilty of something, the lies that are told, the twists of the legal system and the simple horrible stupidity of the crimes provide drama enough." Brian Lowry of Variety stated, "While some of those made-for-TV encounters feel a little stilted, they do tend to pull you along, wanting to see how the drama plays out." Neil Genzlinger of The New York Times states, "The idea that the criminal justice arena also needs a TV show to serve as equalizer is somehow dismaying. Investigative journalism programs have done this for years, but Cold Justice is more ride-to-the-rescue, less public service." David Hinckley of the New York Daily News stated, "There isn't a lot of drama." He added, "Seeking justice is good. Don't hate us if we don't always watch."

Lawsuits
In August 2014, a Gallatin, Tennessee, man filed a defamation lawsuit against the show's producers for implicating and never fully exonerating him in their investigation into the 2010 death of a woman who was suffocated and stabbed inside her home. Joshua Singletary was treated for cuts at the hospital around the time of the murder and arrested as a suspect. He was later released owing to insufficient evidence. According to Singletary, the aired episode ruined his reputation and caused his business to lose customers. He requested a jury trial, seeking $100,000 in damages and other compensations. The lawsuit was reportedly closed in May 2015.

In August 2015, another lawsuit arose from acquitted murder suspect Steven Noffsinger, who sued the series' producers, Siegler, McClary, and Brown for civil rights violations and defamation.

Spin-off

In October 2014, TNT announced it had green-lighted a spin-off of Cold Justice. The new series, titled Cold Justice: Sex Crimes, began on July 31, 2015, and features unsolved sex crimes. Former Harris County, Texas, prosecutors Casey Garrett and Alicia O'Neill travel around the United States to help local law enforcement officers close dormant cases. The first season has 10 episodes.

See also
Cold Case Files, USA / A&E, 1999 (true cases)
Solved, USA / ID, 2008 (true cases)
To Catch a Killer, CAN / OWN, 2014 (true cases)

References

External links
  on Wolf Entertainment
  on Oxygen
 

2010s American drama television series
2013 American television series debuts
American television series revived after cancellation
English-language television shows
Oxygen (TV channel) original programming
Television series about missing people
Television series by Wolf Films
Television series by Magical Elves
Television shows set in Los Angeles
TNT (American TV network) original programming
True crime television series
Television series about prosecutors